Texhnolyze (stylized as TEXHNOLYZE) is a Japanese experimental anime television series animated by Madhouse and directed by Hiroshi Hamasaki. Set in the fictional city of Lux, the story focuses on Ichise, a stoic prize fighter who loses an arm and a leg after offending an unnamed figure. Written by Chiaki J. Konaka, with original character design by Yoshitoshi ABe, the series was produced by Yasuyuki Ueda and was broadcast on Fuji Television and its affiliates from April to September 2003.

Plot

Texhnolyze primarily follows Ichise, an underground fighter who has an arm and leg cut off one night after displeasing an unnamed, presumably influential, man. Ichise is brought back from the brink of death by Eriko "Doc" Kaneda, who replaces Ichise's lost limbs with prosthetic limbs through a process known as "texhnolyzation" enabled by the fictional material raffia, which is mined from underneath Lux and serves as the city's only export and reason to exist. Doc tells Ichise that the limbs are special prototypes she made which contain the DNA of Ichise's dead mother, having incorporated the last bit of her remains into its circuitry.

Through this connection to Doc, Ichise becomes entangled in the dealings between three major factions who battle to control Lux: the Organo, an organized crime syndicate made up of "professionals" who are the closest thing to a government in the city of Lux; the Salvation Union, a populist group that seeks to disrupt the Organo's business; and the Raccan, a collection of young troublemakers with texhnolyzed limbs who use their abilities for personal gain.

Ichise soon meets a mysterious young girl, Ran, a seer from the nearby village of Gabe who has the power to see possible futures. He also crosses paths with the mysterious Yoshi, a traveler "from above" who begins to cause chaos in the city, inciting fights between the existing factions. As the situation in Lux deteriorates, strange new enemies from "the Class", an exclusionary group of elites who live from from Lux, begin to appear and convert members of the three factions to their own side. These "Shapes" are revealed to be controlled by Kano, a leader of the Class produced by repeated incestuous mating over generations. 

In order to stop Kano's plans to invade the surface world after conquering Lux, Ichise and Doc travel to the surface, as the three factions of Lux unite in order to fight against their common enemy. The two travel through miles of empty idyllic countryside before encountering an administrative center, which they find to be empty save for assortments of stacked furniture and radios endlessly repeating news broadcasts from an undetermined time before. They discover that the inhabitants of the surface have become "theonormals", who have lost all desire to live yet are maintained by the fantastical technology of the surface world. Having resigned themselves to extinction, the theonormals pay no mind to the warnings of Ichise and Doc, instead choosing to wait for their end without a care. 

Meanwhile, underground, the Shapes are winning in their battles with the citizens of Lux. The leader of the Salvation Union dies in battle, while the leader of the Raccan drives to the living place of the Class and murders them in cold blood before being shot himself by Kano's assistant. Aboveground, Doc and Ichise wander into an empty movie theater, where they watch a soundless newsreel which explains how centuries before the people of the surface, plagued by terrorism and violence, rounded up the various undesirables of society and sent them underground to live in the city of Lux.

Doc, driven to despair by the discovery that the surface world and the theonormals have no cure or care for their situation, commits suicide in a hotel room. Ichise, meanwhile, wanders through the city and engages theonormals in conversation. The theonormals tell Ichise that death would be a welcome relief for them. Deciding to return to Lux, Ichise comes across the image of his father, who is fading away just like the other theonormals. Ichise apologizes to his father's image for holding him responsible for his mother's death before moving on.

Although the main entrance from Lux was destroyed by the theonormals to prevent the Shapes from ascending to the surface, Ichise is told of an alternative entrance by a mysterious hologram who explains the plight of the people of the surface to him. When he arrives at this entrance, Ichise encounters Haruhiko Tooyama, who had previously mentored him when he was first adopted by the Organo. Now a Shape, Tooyama kills his two Shape comrades before challenging Ichise to a duel to the death. After being beheaded by Ichise, Tooyama thanks him. Ichise continues down into the city.

In the city, all traces of resistance to the Shapes have been destroyed, and the Shapes themselves have become rooted to the ground, their life-support systems keeping the heads and organs attached to their exoskeletons still alive. A flashback details how the citizens of Lux fell to the onslaught of the Shapes, with only a few scattered groups of survivors still unchanged. Ichise makes his way through the city, following phantom images of Ran and encountering former colleagues who are now 'rooted' to the ground as Shapes. As the power systems that keep the artificial lighting of Lux on begin to fail, plunging the city into darkness, Ichise makes his way to an opera house where he confronts Kano. Along the way he witnesses a mob of maddened citizens kill Ooshi, former leader of the Organo and mentor to Ichise, and in a rage he murders the mob, sustaining many injuries in the process.

In the opera house, Ichise finds that Kano is alone with many of the rooted Shapes, along with a statue containing the head of Ran, who killed herself rather than live in the world Kano has created. Kano reveals his solipsistic beliefs, stating that he is the only person in the world who is alive and sane, and that he has turned the Shapes into living plants who will keep their hosts alive indefinitely until the time comes that humanity can overcome their violent natures. Enraged at Ran's death, Ichise punches Kano's head off and leaves the opera house.

Afterwards, alone on an abandoned rooftop, Ichise begins to collapse as the power systems that control his texhnolyzed limbs begin to fail along with the rest of the power of Lux. As he lays dying, accepting his end, his artifical limb suddenly displays a crude drawing of a flower which Ran had handed him earlier. Ichise smiles and slumps over, succumbing to his injuries.

Characters

Ichise is the main protagonist of Texhnolyze. He rarely speaks, and is mostly passive in his behavior, but occasionally lashes out violently. First appearing as an unlicensed boxer, throughout the series he pursues a sense of meaning as he becomes increasingly involved in the conflict between the various factions of Lux.

Ran, a young child, is a seer from the neighboring city of Gabe. She is primarily seen selling orchids while wearing a white fox mask wherever she travels. Ran has the gift of foresight, which allows her to see glimpses of the future. Unfortunately, this ability often pains her, as she is unable to change the events of the future that she sees. She has an unexplained, but profound interest in Ichise, and throughout the series she appears to help guide him.

Doc is a medical specialist from the mysterious Class, a group of elite individuals who live far away from Lux. She studies the process of texhnolyzation, the fictional technology that allows humans to control prosthetic limbs easily. She provides special prototype prosthetics for Ichise to replace his missing limbs, and follows him through the plot out of an interest in both him and the effects her experimental technology have on him.

Onishi is the current chairman of the Organo, and claims to hear "the voice of the city" speak into his mind. He is characterized as a confident man with a clear belief in his own purpose and strong willpower, who is skilled in both combat and diplomacy. Throughout the story, Onishi attempts to maintain peace with the Salvation Union and stay loyal to his organization.

Shinji is the leader of the Raccan. A young, cocky man, Shinji seems to be the extent of what authority exists in the anarchistic Raccan. He often rails against the interference of the other two factions of Lux into the lives of his group, and harbors a particularly deep hatred for the Class. 

Yoshii is a mysterious visitor to the city of Lux, who is first seen descending a large, industrial staircase from an unknown location. Adventurous, charismatic, and purposeful, Yoshii's interactions with the citizens of Lux spark a series of changes that send the three factions vying for control of the society into a frenzy.

Release
Texhnolyze aired for twenty episodes on Fuji Television from April 16 to September 24, 2003. Two un-aired episodes were included in the DVD release. Geneon USA's English dub of the series aired in the United States on STARZ!/Encore's Action channel in 2006, then aired again on Funimation Channel and Funimation Channel on Demand when Funimation licensed the series from Geneon Entertainment. It also aired in Canada on G4techTV Canada's Anime Current block in the mid-2000s. Japanese visual kei singer Gackt's song Tsuki no Uta was selected as its ending theme.

Episode list

Notes

References

Further reading

External links

2003 anime television series debuts
Anime with original screenplays
Cyberpunk anime and manga
Existentialist anime and manga
Funimation
Geneon USA
Madhouse (company)
NBCUniversal Entertainment Japan
Psychological thriller anime and manga